Christopher Morris, known by the stage name Lance Fortune (born 4 January 1940, Birkenhead, Cheshire, England), is an English pop singer.

Morris was classically trained on piano. He formed a rock and roll group called the Firecrests while a student at Birkenhead School, and served as lead vocalist; they recorded the songs "That'll Be the Day", "I Knew From the Start", and "Party", but were strictly a local attraction. After leaving University early, Morris was discovered by impresario Larry Parnes while working and singing at the 2i's Coffee Bar in London. Parnes gave him the stage name Lance Fortune, a name he had previously considered for another artist he signed in 1959, Georgie Fame. The newly christened Fortune signed to Pye Records as a solo artist, and released four singles, two of which became hits in the UK Singles Chart in 1960. "Be Mine" reached No. 4, whilst the follow-up, "This Love I Have For You" was a Top 30 hit.

In April 1960, Fortune and Jerry Keller replaced Eddie Cochran on Gene Vincent's then current UK tour, after Cochran's untimely death in a road accident.

Later in the 1960s, Fortune joined a group called the Staggerlees.

Releases
"Be Mine" / "Action" (Pye Records, 1960) UK No. 4
"All On My Own" / "This Love I Have For You" (Pye, 1960) - B-side UK No. 26
"I Wonder" / "Will You Still be My Girl" (Pye, 1960)
"Who's Gonna Tell Me?" / "Love Is the Sweetest Thing" (Pye, 1960?)

References

1940 births
Living people
English pop singers
English male singers
People from Birkenhead
People educated at Birkenhead School